Australia has a rich sporting history. Sports museums and halls of fame have been established to recognize and promote the achievements of Australian athletes and sporting teams. This list is restricted to sports museums with a national focus and halls of fame with a national and state focus. Many Australian state sports organisations have established halls of fame but these are not listed.

Sports museums and halls of fame

Memorabilia museums

There are other museums in Australia that manage sport memorabilia. These include: National Museum of Australia and Powerhouse Museum.

See also
Sport in Australia

References

 
History of sport in Australia
Australia sport-related lists